Subligna is an unincorporated community in Chattooga County, Georgia, United States.

History
A post office was established at Subligna in 1848, and remained in operation until it was discontinued in 1953. The name honors a settler named Dr. William Dunlap Underwood, subligna being a Latin construct meaning "under wood".

The Georgia General Assembly incorporated Subligna as a town in 1870. The town's municipal charter was repealed in 1995.

References

Former municipalities in Georgia (U.S. state)
Unincorporated communities in Chattooga County, Georgia
Unincorporated communities in Georgia (U.S. state)
Populated places disestablished in 1995